Sir Thomas Drummond Shiels MC MB ChB (7 August 1881 – 1 January 1953) was a Scottish Labour politician.

Life

The son of James Drummond Shiels, photographer, and Agnes Campbell of Edinburgh, he was educated at Edinburgh University where he graduated MB ChB. Prior to obtaining his medical degree he worked as a photographer in Edinburgh.

He was commissioned into the Royal Scots in 1915  and served in World War I with the 9th (Scottish) Division. He was mentioned in despatches and awarded the Military Cross and the Belgian Croix de Guerre. He ended the war as a Captain.

He was a member of Edinburgh Town Council and Labour Member of Parliament for Edinburgh East from 1924 to 1931. He served in government as Parliamentary Under-Secretary of State for India in 1929 and as Parliamentary Under-Secretary of State for the Colonies from 1929 to 1931.

He was a Fellow and Senior President Royal Medical Society and Deputy-Secretary of the Commonwealth Parliamentary Association. He was knighted in the 1939 Birthday Honours for his service as Chairman of the Joint Standing Committee for Educational work of the Non-political Empire Societies in London.

He contributed the opening chapter to The British Commonwealth, a Family of Peoples published in 1952.

He is buried with his parents near the south-west corner of the western extensions to Grange Cemetery in Edinburgh.

References

External links 
 

1881 births
1953 deaths
Alumni of the University of Edinburgh
Councillors in Edinburgh
Members of the Fabian Society
Members of the Parliament of the United Kingdom for Edinburgh constituencies
Scottish Labour MPs
Scottish Labour councillors
UK MPs 1924–1929
UK MPs 1929–1931
Royal Scots officers
Recipients of the Military Cross
Knights Bachelor
20th-century Scottish medical doctors
Recipients of the Croix de guerre (Belgium)
British Army personnel of World War I
Scottish photographers